WCQT-LD, virtual channel 27 (UHF digital channel 25), is a low-powered Walk TV-affiliated television station licensed to Cullman, Alabama, United States. The station is owned by the Alabama Cable Network.

References

External links

CQT-LD
Television channels and stations established in 1994
1994 establishments in Alabama